Phruriastis is a genus of moths belonging to the family Tineidae.

Species
''Phruriastis meliphaga' Meyrick, 1923 (from Fiji)

References

Tineidae
Tineidae genera